The Empty House may refer to:

Novels
 The Empty House (novel) — a 1974 suspense novel by Michael Gilbert

Short Stories
 The Adventure of the Empty House — a Sherlock Holmes story